The 1988 WAFU Club Championship was the twelfth football club tournament season that took place for the runners-up of each West African country's domestic league, the West African Club Championship. It was won by ASFAG Conakry after defeating New Nigerian Bank FC under the away goals rule.  A total of 37 goals were scored, fewer than last season. Originally a 28 match season, no Nigerien (also as Nigerite or Niameyan) and Gambian clubs took part. New Nigerian Bank started their first match at the quarterfinals, Okwahu United directly headed to the semis. Asses FC withdrew from the competition.

Preliminary round
The matches took place on June 5 and 19

|}

Quarterfinals
The matches took place on July 3 and 17

|}

Semifinals
The matches took place on August 14 and 28

|}

Finals
The matches took place on November 12 and 26.

|}

Winners

See also
1988 African Cup of Champions Clubs
1988 CAF Cup Winners' Cup

Notes

References

External links
Full results of the 1988 WAFU Club Championship at RSSSF

West African Club Championship
1988 in African football